The Haralson County School District is a public school district in Haralson County, Georgia, United States, based in Tallapoosa. It serves the communities of Buchanan, Tallapoosa, and Waco.

Schools
The Haralson County School District has four elementary schools, one middle school, and one high school.

Elementary schools
Buchanan Elementary School
Buchanan Primary School
Tallapoosa Primary School
West Haralson Elementary School

Middle school
Haralson County Middle School

High school
Haralson County High School

Controversies
In 2013 a bus driver of the district wrote a Facebook post about a child who reported being hungry; he stated that the child stated that he was denied food because there was a lack of $.40 in the account. The district threatened to fire him if he did not remove his Facebook post, and if he did, he would have to apologize and take a two-week suspension. Instead the bus driver refused to rescind his post and filed a federal lawsuit against the school district. The American Civil Liberties Union (ACLU) took the case in 2014.

See also
Bremen City School District

References

External links
Haralson County School District

School districts in Georgia (U.S. state)
Education in Haralson County, Georgia